Juan José Rodríguez Morales (born 23 June 1967) is a retired Costa Rican football player.

Club career
Nicknamed Peché, the defender played for a few teams, including San Carlos.

International career
Rodríguez made his debut at almost 35 years of age for Costa Rica in an April 2002 friendly match against Japan and earned a total of 4 caps, scoring no goals. All games were 2002 World Cup warm-up games. He was a surprise inclusion in Costa Rica's 2002 FIFA World Cup squad, although he played no part in the tournament. He later denied allegations he was selected due to family relations with coach Alexandre Guimarães.

His final international was a May 2002 friendly against Belgium.

Personal life
Rodríguez is married to Kattia Vargas and they have three children. He works at the Comité Cantonal de Deportes de San Carlos.

References

External links

1967 births
Living people
People from Grecia (canton)
Association football defenders
Costa Rican footballers
Costa Rica international footballers
2002 FIFA World Cup players
Belén F.C. players
A.D. San Carlos footballers